Thato Frederick Ntandyenkosi Ngoza (born 20 October 1991) is a South African professional rugby union player who last played for the Falcons (rugby union) in the Currie Cup and the Rugby Challenge. His regular position is as a loose-forward or a lock.

Career

Youth

He then joined the Griffons and played for the  team in the 2010 Under-19 Provincial Championship tournament.

Griffons

Free State Cheetahs

He played for the  side in the 2011 Under-21 Provincial Championship and 2012 Under-21 Provincial Championship competitions. In 2013, he was included in the  Vodacom Cup side and made two substitute appearances, also scoring a last-minute try in their match against the 

Blue Bulls

Varsity Cup

Statistics

References

1991 births
Living people
People from Piet Retief, Mpumalanga
South African rugby union players
Free State Cheetahs players
Griffons (rugby union) players
Southern Kings players
Blue Bulls players
Eastern Province Elephants players
Boland Cavaliers players
Falcons (rugby union) players
Rugby union locks
Rugby union players from Mpumalanga
Leopards (rugby union) players